Darius Creston McCrary (born May 1, 1976) is an American actor, rapper, singer and producer. McCrary is known for his role as Edward "Eddie" Winslow, the oldest child of Carl and Harriette Winslow on the ABC/CBS television sitcom Family Matters, which ran from 1989–1998.

He also played Scam in the 1987 comedy film Big Shots, which was his film debut. He provided the voice of Jazz in Transformers (2007). From December 2009 to October 2011, he portrayed photographer Malcolm Winters on the CBS daytime drama The Young and the Restless.

Early life and career
McCrary began his career as a child actor and made his film debut in the 1987 comedy Big Shots. He also appeared in guest spots in episodic television and had a role in the 1988 film Mississippi Burning before landing the role of Eddie Winslow in Family Matters the following year. After Family Matters ended its run in 1998, McCrary co-starred in the short-lived UPN series Freedom. In 2000, he had a lead role as Tommy in "Something to Sing About", a Christian drama produced by the Billy Graham Evangelistic Association. In 2001, he appeared in 15 Minutes opposite Robert De Niro and Kingdom Come, with Whoopi Goldberg.

In April and May 2006, McCrary reunited with his Family Matters co-star Kellie Shanygne Williams as Jamal on UPN's Eve for two episodes. In 2007, he was the voice of Jazz in the movie Transformers. In 2009, he voiced Tarix in Bionicle: The Legend Reborn. McCrary also had film roles in Next Day Air, Saw VI, and in national stage play productions such as The Maintenance Man. That December, he joined the cast of the CBS daytime drama The Young and the Restless. McCrary portrayed Malcolm Winters, a role originated by Shemar Moore. Joined on the series by his former Family Matters co-star Bryton James (né McClure), McCrary left The Young and the Restless in October 2011. McCrary's first album was also released the same year.

On January 6, 2010, McCrary appeared as himself in an episode of I Get That a Lot on CBS. He was pumping gas, and Paris Hilton was pretending to be a clerk at the gas station. She recognized him and asked for his autograph. He thought it was her and after she confessed who she was, he said he thought she was doing community service. McCrary later starred in the stage play In-Laws From Hell written, directed, and produced by Andrionna L. Williams.

Personal life 
McCrary is the founder of FathersCare, a non-profit organization. FathersCare is an organization under the McCrary Foundation umbrella, started by his father, aunts and uncles, also known as The McCrarys.

In 2015, he was arrested and held in custody for failure to pay child support, but was released after two hours when he paid the full $5,500 in back support owed.

Filmography

Film

Television

Music Video

Music career

2016

Award nominations

References

External links
 
 
 

1976 births
Living people
Male actors from California
African-American male actors
American male child actors
American male film actors
American male television actors
American male voice actors
People from Walnut, California
20th-century American male actors
21st-century American male actors
20th-century African-American people
21st-century African-American people